Roberto Orlando may refer to:

Roberto Orlando Affonso Júnior (born 1983), Brazilian footballer playing in Hong Kong
Roberto Orlando (athlete) (born 1995), Italian athlete